Auchay-sur-Vendée (literally Auchay on Vendée) is a commune in the department of Vendée, western France. The municipality was established on 1 January 2017 by merger of the former communes of Auzay (the seat) and Chaix.

See also 
Communes of the Vendée department

References 

Communes of Vendée
States and territories established in 2017